Günter Krivec (born 28 July 1942) is a German athlete. He competed in the men's triple jump at the 1964 Summer Olympics.

References

1942 births
Living people
Athletes (track and field) at the 1964 Summer Olympics
German male triple jumpers
Olympic athletes of the United Team of Germany
Place of birth missing (living people)